Upper Canterton is a village in Hampshire, England, located at . It is near Minstead.

References

External links

Villages in Hampshire